Agatharchus or Agatharch of Syracuse was a Syracusan who was placed by the Syracusans over a fleet of twelve ships in 413 BC, to visit their allies and harass the Athenians.  He was afterwards, in the same year, one of the Syracusan commanders in the decisive battle fought in the city's harbor during the Battle of Syracuse.

Notes

References
 

Ancient Syracusans
Ancient Greek generals
5th-century BC people